Hans Välimäki (born 23 April 1970) is a Finnish chef, and since 1998, was the owner of the now closed restaurant Chez Dominique. Välimäki was the chief judge of the Sub culinary show Top Chef Suomi  and hosts the Finnish version of Ramsay's Kitchen Nightmares, Kuppilat kuntoon, Hans Välimäki!.

Välimäki is married and has four children.

Bibliography
 Kahden tähden keittokirja, Kaisaniemen Dynamo, 2003
 Koti keittiössä, Otava, 2004 – vuoden 2004 suomalainen keittokirja. (food: Hans Välimäki, pictures: Sami Repo, text: Mikko Takala) reprint 2007
 Chez Dominique, Otava, 2004 (food: Hans Välimäki, pictures: Sami Repo, text: Mikko Takala)
 Grillistä, Otava, 2005 (food: Hans Välimäki ; pictures: Sami Repo ; text: Mikko Takala.)
 P.S.: parasta sokerista, Otava, 2007 (desserts and pastries: Hans Välimäki, Vesa Parviainen, pictures: Sami Repo, text: Mikko Takala, Anu Hopia.)
 Välimäki, Otava, 2008 (food: Hans Välimäki, pictures: Sami Repo, text: Mikko Takala.
 Lusikka soppaan!, Otava, 2009 (food: Hans Välimäki, pictures: Sami Repo, text: Mikko Takala).
 Mummola, Otava, 2009 (food: Hans Välimäki ; pictures: Sami Repo ; text: Mikko Takala.)
 Ruokaa Ranskasta Hansin tapaan, WSOY, 2010 (food: Hans Välimäki ; pictures: Sami Repo ; text: Kenneth Nars.))

Awards
 First Michelin star 2001, second star 2003
 Helsinki Medal
 Restaurateur of The Year 2003, International Food & Beverage Forum

References

External links
 
 

1970 births
Living people
Finnish chefs
Finnish restaurateurs
Finnish food writers
Finnish television chefs